A Company Man is a 2012 South Korean action film starring So Ji-sub, Lee Mi-yeon, Kwak Do-won and Kim Dong-jun. It is about a hitman who finds himself targeted by his ex-employers after he falls in love with a single mother and quits his job.

A Company Man was released in South Korean theatres on 11 October 2012. American distribution company Well Go USA Entertainment released the film in American theatres on 27 August 2013.

Plot

Ji Hyeong-do works for a metal fabrication company which is actually a front for their assassination trade. Hyeong-Do is one of the most skilled assassins. One day, Hyeong-do is assigned to get rid of his young partner Ra-Hun. Ra Hun asks Hyeong-Do to give money to his family as a favor. Hyeong-do visits Ra Hun's home, where he meets Ra Hun's mother, Yu Mi-Yeon, a former singer, and falls in love with her. When Hyeong-do's colleague wants to quit his job at the company as his job has become meaningless to him after his son's death. Hyeong-do is assigned the task of finishing him but finds himself in a life crisis as well, and his bonding with Mi-Yeon is increasing day by day.

The company's boss thinks very highly of him, even though his direct superior, Kwon has a problem with him. Eventually, Hyeong-Do's crisis makes him end up in a situation in which he becomes disloyal to the company and suddenly finds himself to become the target of his former employees. Learning this, Hyeong-go and Mi-Yeon leave for a safe place to start a new life, but Kwon and his colleagues catch up to him and kill Mi-Yeon in front of him and shoots Hyeong-Do, who survives and leaves for his office where he intends to finish them and a shootout ensues, in which Hyeong-Do finishes the assassins and Kwon. Later, the police surround the building, and Hyeong-Do surrenders to the police.

Cast
So Ji-sub as Ji Hyeong-do   
Lee Mi-yeon - Yoo Mi-yeon 
Kwak Do-won - Kwon Jong-tae  
Kim Dong-jun as Ra Hoon
Lee Geung-young as Ban Ji-hoon, department head 
Han Bo-bae as Ra Bo-seul
Yoo Ha-bok as Jin Chae-gook, department head
Yoo Na-mi as Miss Ahn, receptionist
Hong Kyung-yeon as Yang, chief of the equipment materials team
Jeon Guk-hwan as Representative Jeon
Lee Jae-yoon as Shin Ip-nam, sales
Park Ji-soo as Dispensary employee

Reception
The film achieved one million admissions 12 days after its release. It was sold to 55 countries including Japan, China, Thailand in Asia, as well as France, Switzerland, Austria, the Netherlands and Belgium in Europe.

References

External links 
 
 
 

2012 films
2012 action thriller films
South Korean action thriller films
Films about contract killing
Films about organized crime in South Korea
Showbox films
2010s Korean-language films
South Korean action drama films
2012 directorial debut films
2010s South Korean films